Feuillet may refer to:

Feuillet, Panama
Louis Éconches Feuillée (sometimes spelled Feuillet) (1660–1732), French explorer, astronomer, geographer, and botanist
Octave Feuillet (1821–1890), French novelist and dramatist
Raoul Auger Feuillet (c. 1653 – c. 1709), French dance notator, publisher, and choreographer who described Beauchamp–Feuillet notation